Gong Maoxin and Zhang Ze were the defending champions but chose not to defend their title.

Sriram Balaji and Vishnu Vardhan won the title after defeating Hsieh Cheng-peng and Peng Hsien-yin 6–3, 6–4 in the final.

Seeds

Draw

References
 Main Draw

Chengdu Challenger - Doubles
2017 Doubles